Lucien Hippolyte Gosselin (January 2, 1883 - March 25, 1940) was an American sculptor active in New England.

Gosselin was born in Whitefield, New Hampshire, the son of French-speaking immigrants Fidèle Gosselin and Lucrèce Hébert, sister of noted Quebecois sculptor Louis-Philippe Hébert. When he was 2, the family moved to Manchester, New Hampshire. After school graduation, he joined his brothers in a barbershop, but as he had shown an aptitude for art, he began training in the studio of a Manchester artist, Emile Maupas. In 1911, with the encouragement of Maupas and Bishop Guertin, Gosselin enrolled in the Académie Julian in Paris, where he studied for five years. In his first two years, he was awarded the Prix Julian. He exhibited in the Paris Salon of 1913 and 1914, winning an Honorable Mention in 1913. Gosselin returned to Manchester in 1916, where from 1920 until his death, he taught sculpture at the Manchester Institute of Arts and Sciences.

Selected works 

 Sacred Heart Monument (1920), Notre Dame de Lourdes Church, Fall River, Massachusetts
 World War I Memorial (1928), Manchester, New Hampshire
 Judge Alfred J. Chretien bust, c.1930,in the Currier Museum of Art
 Sweeney Memorial (1931), Manchester, New Hampshire
 Pulaski Memorial (1938), Manchester, New Hampshire
 Dubois Memorial, Laconia, New Hampshire
 Gatineau Memorial, Southbridge, Massachusetts
 Monsignor Millette Memorial, Nashua, New Hampshire
 Father Boissoneault Memorial, Saint Johnsbury, Vermont

References 
 Le Québec et les francophones de la Nouvelle-Angleterre, Dean R. Louder, Presses Université Laval, pages 14–15, 1991.
 "Looking Back with Aurore Eaton: Local sculptor chosen to create monument for Pulaski Park", Aurore Eaton, New Hampshire Union Leader, October 22, 2017.
 Find-a-Grave article
 CowHampshire blog article
 Manchester Historical Association article

Académie Julian alumni
American people of French-Canadian descent
American sculptors
Artists from New Hampshire
1883 births
1940 deaths
People from Whitefield, New Hampshire